St Gerard's Church and Monastery collectively form one of Wellington's most distinctive and iconic landmarks. Located on Mount Victoria in Wellington, both buildings are classified as "Category I" ("places of 'special or outstanding historical or cultural heritage significance or value'") historic places by the New Zealand Historic Places Trust. They are built on the site of a sixteen-roomed house (called Fitzgerald's Folly) and property owned by James Edward Fitzgerald who some claim to be New Zealand's first Prime Minister. In April 2021, the owners of the buildings, the International Catholic Programme of Evangelisation (ICPE), announced that the church would close at the end of the following month due to safety concerns.

The Church
The church was built in 1908, to the design of John Swan, for the Congregation of the Most Holy Redeemer, known as Redemptorists, a religious institute of priests and brothers. The church was the first in the world to be dedicated to the Italian member of their order and saint, Gerard Majella, after his canonisation. It is constructed to a simple gothic design built of brick, accommodating about 200 people. The church is noted for its assemblage of fine stained glass windows produced by Hardman and Son of Birmingham, "rated by the company the best they had ever exported." Swan designed the fine marble altar made of green Devonshire marble with supporting columns of green Galway marble, and throne and white steps of white Carrara marble. A panel of Italian mosaics depicting the Annunciation adorns the altar front.

St Gerard
As the first church in the world dedicated to Gerard Majella, the church was the location for an oil painting of St Gerard in Ecstasy which was given by Pope Pius X to the Wellington church in recognition of that status. The work was painted in Rome by Giovanni Gagliardi for the saint's beatification in 1893. In 1904, for the canonisation, the painting was carried through Rome in procession and hung in St Peter's.

The Monastery

Completed in 1932, funded by public donations, the three storied Monastery was constructed as a home for the Redemptorists. The foundation stone was laid by Archbishop Redwood and it was blessed and opened on 10 April 1932 by Archbishop O'Shea (who was coadjutor bishop at that time). Frederick de Jersey Clere is usually regarded as the architect for the monastery in succession to, or in collaboration with his architectural practice partner, John Swan. The structure is of reinforced concrete with brick in-fill panels, Gothic windows and red-brick arches for the cloisters which are situated to benefit from the northern sun.

The prominent and dominant position of the monastery has been preserved by the Wellington City Council acquiring property between the monastery and the cliff over Oriental Bay to prevent the buildings being obscured from view from almost any vantage point around Wellington Harbour.

The Redemptorists

The Redemptorists first arrived in Wellington in 1882 and were based in the Fitzgerald house from 1908 until its replacement by the monastery building in 1932. For 56 years from 1932 to 1988, St Gerard's Monastery was the centre of their mission in New Zealand. This consisted of the preaching of parish retreats and missions all around the country and they presented devotional activities at St Gerard's itself such as frequent and regular novenas, rosary and other devotions. The Redemptorists also had the Holy Family Confraternity for men and the Confraternity of Our Lady of Perpetual Succour for women. "A well-patronised service was an undertaking always to have a priest available for anonymous confession or spiritual consultation at the press of a special doorbell." The monastery had an outstanding choir which was heard on radio in a series of services beginning in October 1927. Gradually the sermon took precedence over the music and this attracted more listeners, many of them non-Catholics.

In 1988, because of the costs associated with the buildings and their own declining numbers, the Redemptorists decided to sell the buildings and remove the St Gerard painting.

Institute for World Evangelisation
The complex was acquired in 1992 by the Institute for World Evangelisation - ICPE Mission, a Catholic association of the faithful, for use as a retreat and training centre for Catholic evangelist missionaries, to be operated by a resident community. The church's public worship role continued with a Mass celebrated by the Institute's priests every Sunday at 10.30am.

In 2020 and 2021 ICPE was unable to run its missionary school due to restrictions on international travel following the COVID-19 pandemic. At the same time, ICPE was struggling to secure sufficient funds to strengthen the earthquake-prone buildings. The last Mass would be celebrated on 23 May 2021.

See also

 Redemptorists of Australia and New Zealand
 Roman Catholic Archdiocese of Wellington
 Sacred Heart Cathedral, Wellington
 St Joseph's Church, Mt Victoria
 St Mary of the Angels, Wellington
 Catholic Church in New Zealand

Notes

References
 
  (photographs by Grant Sheehan)

External links
 IPCE Mission in New Zealand
 Wellington City Council, St Gerard's Church and Monastery

Heritage New Zealand Category 1 historic places in the Wellington Region
Roman Catholic churches in Wellington City
1900s architecture in New Zealand
1930s architecture in New Zealand
Redemptorist churches
Frederick de Jersey Clere church buildings
20th-century Roman Catholic church buildings in New Zealand
Gothic Revival church buildings in New Zealand